Albert Martin was a Scottish sailor and Olympic Champion. He competed for the Royal Clyde Yacht Club at the 1908 Summer Olympics at Hunters Quay, and won a gold medal in the 12 metre class.

He was a crew member of the Scottish boat Hera, which won the gold medal in the 12 metre class.

References

External links
 
 
 

Place of birth missing
Year of birth missing
Year of death missing
Sailors at the 1908 Summer Olympics – 12 Metre
Olympic sailors of Great Britain
British male sailors (sport)
Olympic gold medallists for Great Britain
Olympic medalists in sailing
Scottish Olympic medallists
Scottish male sailors (sport)
Medalists at the 1908 Summer Olympics